William Curtis Sturtevant (1926 Morristown, New Jersey – March 2, 2007) was an anthropologist and ethnologist. He is best known as the general editor of the 20-volume Handbook of North American Indians. Renowned anthropologist Claude Lévi-Strauss described the work as "an absolutely indispensable tool that should be found on the shelves of all libraries, public and private alike."

Sturtevant's career focused on Native American languages and cultures.  He was particularly known for his work on the history and culture of the Florida Seminole. During his career, he served as the president for the American Society for Ethnohistory, the American Ethnological Society, and the American Anthropological Association.

Life
He graduated from the University of California, Berkeley in 1949, and from Yale University  with a Ph.D. in 1955, where he was a student of Floyd Lounsbury.  He served first as a research anthropologist for the Bureau of American Ethnology before being appointed Curator of North American Ethnology in the U.S. National Museum (later the National Museum of Natural History), Smithsonian Institution.

Sturtevant argued for the importance of material culture in anthropology, particularly in incorporating the contents of museum collections.  A list of his published and unpublished work is available at the National Anthropological Archives of the Smithsonian Institution.

Family
He was the eldest son of the geneticist Alfred Sturtevant. He was married to Theda Maw from 1952 to 1986; they had three children. Sturtevant remarried in 1990, to linguist Sally McLendon. Sturtevant died on March 2, 2007, from emphysema.

References

External links
Jason Baird Jackson,  William C. Sturtevant (1926–2007), Museum Anthropology blog. Sunday, March 4, 2007

Smithsonian Institution people
Yale University alumni
Deaths from emphysema
1926 births
2007 deaths
Place of birth missing
Place of death missing
University of California, Berkeley alumni
People from Morristown, New Jersey
Linguists of Iroquoian languages
Linguists of Muskogean languages
20th-century American anthropologists